Rossedalen Station is a former railway station at Rossedalen in Arendal, Norway. Located on the Arendal Line, it was operated by the Norwegian State Railways. The station was opened on 1 May 1911 and originally consisted of a small station building. The station has never been staffed and has never had a spur or passing loop.

Facilities and service

History
Plans for a station at Rossedalen were launched in 1910, two years after the line past the area opened. It received a small station building identical to the one at Torbjørnsbu Station, designed by Harald Kaas. The station has never been staffed, nor has it had any spurs or passing loops.

References
Bibliography
 

Notes

Railway stations in Arendal
Railway stations on the Arendal Line
Disused railway stations in Norway
Railway stations opened in 1911
1911 establishments in Norway

Year of disestablishment missing